Alex Ross (born 1970) is an American comic book painter, illustrator and plotter.

Alex Ross may also refer to:

Alex Ross (American football) (born 1992), American football quarterback for the San Diego Fleet
Alex Ross (cricketer) (born 1992), Australian cricketer
Alex Ross (music critic) (born 1968), American music critic
Alex Ross (politician) (1880–1953), stonemason, politician and cabinet minister from Alberta, Canada
Alex Ross (rower) (1907–1994), New Zealand rower
Alex Ross (rugby union) (1905–1996), Australian rugby union footballer

See also
Alexander Ross (disambiguation)
Alec Ross (disambiguation)